Gordon Cameron Kannegiesser, Jr. (December 21, 1945 – March 1, 2022) was a Canadian professional ice hockey defenceman. Kannegiesser played 23 games in the National Hockey League for the St. Louis Blues and 127 games in the World Hockey Association with the Houston Aeros and Indianapolis Racers. Kannegiesser died from complications of ALS on March 1, 2022, at the age of 76. He was the brother of Sheldon Kannegiesser.

References

External links
 

1945 births
2022 deaths
Deaths from motor neuron disease 
Neurological disease deaths in Ontario
Canadian ice hockey defencemen
Guelph Royals players
Houston Aeros (WHA) players
Ice hockey people from Ontario
Indianapolis Racers players
Sportspeople from North Bay, Ontario
St. Louis Blues players